A Good Fight (commonly abbreviated AGF) was an American rock band from Fayetteville, Arkansas. At the time of disbandment, the group consisted of Eddie Love, Rizz, Jon Woods, Eddie Mekelburg, and Christian Sanchez. The band's first album, The City Could Be Ours By Morning, was released in February, 2008. Their second album, A Good Fight, was released May 1, 2010. The group went on indefinite hiatus and informally disbanded during the production of their planned third album in 2013, citing artistic differences.

History

2004 - 2006: Formation and early years 
Jon and his brother Dustin (stage name Rizz) founded A Good Fight in 2004. They secured the federal trademark of A Good Fight through the law offices of Asa Hutchinson. The band name is a tribute to a close friend who, in 1994, passed in a car accident. The verse in the Bible from II Timothy 4:7, "I have fought the good fight", is a tribute to their friend. They then reached out to local and popular drummer, Sean Marriott of Hot Springs, Arkansas, who at the time resided in Fayetteville, Arkansas. After the three met, they agreed this would be an attempt to form a band with the goal of seeking national recognition. Their next focus was finding a lead singer. During this time, Jon ran successfully for state representative. Drummer Sean Marriott also was briefly married during this time to Juliet of Fayetteville, Arkansas. She is a good friend of Billy Joe Armstrong of Green Day. Billy Joe wrote the song, "One for the Razorbacks", about her on the Kerplunk album ". Eddie Love was added as a vocalist to the lineup in 2006.

2007 - 2009: First performance and success of first album 
With the lineup complete in 2006, the band rehearsed and wrote material during most of 2006 and 2007. They performed their first show at George's Majestic Lounge in Fayetteville, Arkansas to a crowd of 400 fans on April 21, 2007. Their first album, The City Could be Ours by Morning, was released in February of 2008. It was released at a sold out show at George's Majestic Lounge to critical acclaim. Within just months of the release of the album, the band won a nationwide MTV contest in which 4000 bands competed to have their music played during an MTV reality show.[5] Over a half a million votes were cast and A Good Fight received an overwhelming number of them for the music video for their debut single, "The Drama". MTV contacted the group, after they won the competition, and hosted a party for them at the Embassy Suites John Q. Hammons Center in Rogers, Arkansas, August 1, 2008. The song was played during the season finale of A Shot at Love with Tila Tequila , several episodes of Made, and their music video for "The Drama" was also played on MTV. Due to the popular response of their first album, the band was invited to play at the SXSW Music Festival in Austin, Texas on March 21, 2009.

2010 - 2013: Second album release and continued commercial success 
They went back into the studio in 2009 and began working on their next album, the self-titled, A Good Fight. The second album was released on May 1, 2010, to another sold out show at George's Majestic Lounge to critical acclaim. With extensive touring, the lifestyle of the road took its toll on the drummer, Sean Marriott, who asked to be replaced on good terms. In October 2010, drummer Rob Lee replaced Sean as the new drummer of A Good Fight. The band toured extensively. In early 2011, Rob Lee approached the band about bringing in a good friend and talented guitarist, Eddie Mekelburg. The band was hesitant at first but became open to the idea of having the sound of a second guitar in their live performances. Eddie Mekelburg's talent impressed the band members and they all agreed to add him to the band.

On May 28, 2011, the band played at Rocklahoma in Pryor, Oklahoma and again on May 26, 2012, where drummer Rob Lee met his future wife. Several months later, Rob asked to be replaced on good terms so that he could focus on law school and his new relationship. In August 2012, Christian Sanchez was named the new drummer for A Good Fight. Jon took a break from the road to focus on his new position. He had recently been elected to the Arkansas State Senate and was replaced on the road by experienced, local bassist, Jake Norton in August, 2012. Jon still had a presence in the band, producing the new recordings for a third album, and a manager role. In 2013 the band consisted of Eddie Love, Rizz, Eddie Mekelburg, Jake Norton and Christian Sanchez. The band toured extensively and expanded their influence into the video game industry by landing on Sony PlayStation's MLB 13: The Show. The group played a sold out reunion show on November 8, 2013, at George's Majestic Lounge in Fayetteville, Arkansas with former drummers Sean Marriott and Rob Lee, and bassist Jon Woods.

Current status 
It was announced at a November 8, 2013 show that the band would be taking a break from touring to focus on their next planned album, The Kids Keep Asking For More. In the middle of production, the group disbanded due to internal conflicts. Founding member Jon Woods, former state senator for Arkansas, is currently serving an eighteen-year prison sentence for fraud.

Discography

Albums 
2008: The City Could be Ours by Morning
2010: A Good Fight

Band members 
Eddie Love – lead vocals (2006–2013)
Rizz – lead guitar, backing vocals (2004–2013)
Eddie Mekelburg - rhythm guitar, backing vocals (2011–2013)
Christian Sanchez – drums, percussion, backing vocals (2013)
Jon Woods - bass guitar, backing vocals (2004–present); Record Producer (2004–2013)
 Jake Norton - bass guitar (2013)
 Sean Marriott - drums, percussion, backing vocals (2004–2010)
 Rob Lee - drums, percussion, backing vocals (2010–2012)

Awards and contests

Contests 
Winner - "I Want My Music on MTV"
Winner - ROCKNATION magazine GRAND PRIZE
Winner - AMP "Unsigned Band Contest - Part Duex"

Awards 
NAMA (Northwest Arkansas Music Awards) - 2007 Best New Band 
Celebrate Magazine - 2007 Best Band of the Year 
NAMA (Northwest Arkansas Music Awards) - 2012 Best Band of the Year

References

External links 

 

Alternative rock groups from Arkansas